Khamauli is a village in the Azamgarh district of Uttar Pradesh, India.

References

Villages in Azamgarh district